Kakhi Asatiani (1 January 1947 – 20 November 2002) was a Georgian association football player and manager.

Career
During his career he played for FC Dinamo Tbilisi (1965–1975), Asatiani earned 16 caps for the USSR national football team, and participated in UEFA Euro 1968 and the 1970 FIFA World Cup. At the 1970 World Cup, he was recognized as the most graceful player of the championship. He coached FC Dinamo Tbilisi between 1978 and 1982, and became the team's manager in 1987. In the 1990s, he briefly served as the chairman of the Georgian Sport Department. Subsequently, he was involved in private business and became a Vice-President of the Airzena airline. He was shot to death by unknown assailants in his own car on Barnovi street, near his home, in Tbilisi on 20 November 2002.

References

External links
 Kakhi Asatiani • Articles on FC Dinamo Tbilisi Official Website
 Kakhi Asatiani • Articles on sovsport.ru 
 Kakhi Asatiani • Articles on sport-express.ru 
 Kakhi Asatiani • Profile on allfutbolist.ru 
 
 
 Kakhi Asatiani • Profile on protokoly-khromtsev.narod.ru 
 Kakhi Asatiani • Profile on rusteam.permian.ru
 Kakhi Asatiani • Profile on archive.is
 Kakhi Asatiani • La primera tarjeta amarilla de la Historia

1947 births
2002 deaths
People from Telavi
Svan people
Footballers from Georgia (country)
Businesspeople from Georgia (country)
Soviet footballers
Soviet Union international footballers
Soviet Top League players
FC Dinamo Tbilisi players
FC Dinamo Tbilisi managers
UEFA Euro 1968 players
1970 FIFA World Cup players
Association football midfielders
Football managers from Georgia (country)
Burials in Georgia (country)
20th-century businesspeople